, also known as Tenmon, was a  after Kyōroku and before Kōji. This period spanned from July 1532 through October 1555.

Change of era
 1532 : At the request of Ashikaga Yoshiharu, the 12th shōgun of the Muromachi Bakufu, the era name was changed because of various battles. The previous era ended and a new one commenced in Kyōroku 5, on the 29th day of the 7th month.

Events of the Tenbun era
 1532 (Tenbun 1, 24th day of the 8th month):  Yamashina Hongan-ji set on fire. Hokke Riot in Kyōto.
 1536 (Tenbun 5, 26th day of the 2nd month): Go-Nara is formally installed as emperor.
 1541 (Tenbun 10, 14th day of the 6th month):  Takeda Harunobu (later Takeda Shingen) banishes his father, Takeda Nobutora.
 1542 (Tenbun 11, 25th day of the 8th month): Imagawa Yoshimoto, who was daimyō of Suruga Province, conquered Tōtōmi Province; and from there, he entered Mikawa Province where he battled the daimyō of Owari Province, Oda Nobuhide. The Imagawa forces were defeated by the Oda army.
 1543 (Tenbun 12, 25th day of the 8th month):  Portuguese ship drifts ashore at Tanegashima, and the gun is first introduced into Japan.
 1543 (Tenbun 13, 7th month): There was flooding in Heian-kyō and nearby areas.
 1546 (Tenbun 15, 20th day of the 12th month):  Ashikaga Yoshifushi becomes 13th Shōgun of the Ashikaga shogunate.
 1547 (Tenbun 16): Joseon-Japanese "Treaty of Tenbun", trading limited to Joseon port of Pusan and Sō clan commerce limited to 20 ships annually.
 1548 (Tenbun 17, 30th day of the 12th month):  Nagao Kagetora (later Uesugi Kenshin) replaces his older brother Nagao Harukage as heir to Echigo Province, with triumphant entry in Kasugayama Castle.
 1549 (Tenbun 18, 24th day of the 2nd month):  Princess Nō marries Oda Nobunaga.
 1549 (Tenbun 18, 3rd day of the 7th month):  Jesuit Catholic priest Francis Xavier arrives in Japan at Kagoshima.
 1549 (Tenbun 18, 27th day of the 11th month):  Matsudaira clan of Mikawa Province fall under Imagawa Yoshimoto's rule. Matsudaira Takechiyo (later Tokugawa Ieyasu) departs for Imagawa as a hostage.
 1554 (Tenbun 23, 2nd month): Shogun Yoshihusi was changed to Yoshiteru.

Notes

References
 Hall, John Whitney. (1997). The Cambridge History of Japan: Early Modern Japan. Cambridge: Cambridge University Press. ; 
 Nussbaum, Louis Frédéric and Käthe Roth. (2005). Japan Encyclopedia. Cambridge: Harvard University Press. ; OCLC 48943301
 Titsingh, Isaac. (1834). Nihon Ōdai Ichiran; ou,  Annales des empereurs du Japon.  Paris: Royal Asiatic Society, Oriental Translation Fund of Great Britain and Ireland. OCLC 5850691

External links
 National Diet Library, "The Japanese Calendar" – historical overview plus illustrative images from library's collection

Japanese eras
1530s in Japan
1540s in Japan
1550s in Japan